This List of lakes in Schleswig-Holstein shows a selection of well-known lakes in the North German state of Schleswig-Holstein (sorted by surface area):

See also 

 List of lakes in Germany
 List of waterbodies in Schleswig-Holstein

External links 

 Documentation on the most important lakes in Germany by TU Cottbus, Part 1: Schleswig-Holstein 
 List of lakes in the environmental report of Schleswig-Holstein 

!
Schleswig-Holstein